Marcelo Fabián Espina Barrano (born April 28, 1967 in Buenos Aires) is a retired Argentine football midfielder. He played for a number of clubs in Argentina and Chile and represented the Argentina national football team. In the present, he is a soccer match analyst at ESPN South America .

Club career
Espina began his career at Platense in the Primera Division Argentina in 1986. In 1989, he moved to Mexico where he played for Irapuato and then Atlante F.C. In 1992, he returned to Argentina to play for Lanús, but after only one season he returned to Platense.

In 1995, he joined Colo-Colo in Chile, in his first spell at the club he was part of 3 title winning teams. In 1999, he left Colo-Colo to play for Racing Santander of La Liga in Spain. After 2 seasons with Racing, Espina returned to Colo-Colo where he retired in 2004.

International career
Espina represented the Argentina national football team on 15 occasions between 1994 and 1996 scoring 1 goal. He also captained national team in 1995. He is best remembered for being the first player after Diego Maradona's retirement from the National Team to wear the #10 shirt, during the tenure of coach Daniel Passarella, although ostensibly with less skill or success.

Managerial career
After retiring as a player he had spells as manager of Colo-Colo and Everton in Chile. In 2010, he joined Platense of the regionalised 3rd division of Argentine football.

Personal life
Espina naturalized Chilean by residence.

His son, Santiago, was born in Chile and played football at professional level for Platense, San Lorenzo and Deportes Copiapó.

He has worked as a football commentator and analyst for ESPN Chile.

Honours

Club
Platense
 Primera Division Argentina Topscorer (1): 1994 Clausura

Colo-Colo
 Primera División de Chile (4): 1996, 1997–C, 1998, 2002–C
 Copa Chile (1): 1996

References

External links

Argentine Primera Statistics at FutbolXXI.com  

 
Marcelo Espina at HistoriadeColoColo 

1967 births
Living people
Footballers from Buenos Aires
Argentine emigrants to Chile
Argentine footballers
Argentine expatriate footballers
Argentina international footballers
Club Atlético Platense footballers
Irapuato F.C. footballers
Atlante F.C. footballers
Club Atlético Lanús footballers
Correcaminos UAT footballers
Colo-Colo footballers
Racing de Santander players
Argentine Primera División players
Liga MX players
La Liga players
Chilean Primera División players
1995 King Fahd Cup players
1995 Copa América players
Association football midfielders
Argentine football managers
Argentine expatriate football managers
Colo-Colo managers
Everton de Viña del Mar managers
Unión Española managers
Club Atlético Platense managers
Chilean Primera División managers
Primera B Nacional managers
Expatriate footballers in Mexico
Expatriate footballers in Chile
Expatriate footballers in Spain
Expatriate football managers in Chile
Argentine expatriate sportspeople in Mexico
Argentine expatriate sportspeople in Chile
Argentine expatriate sportspeople in Spain
Naturalized citizens of Chile
Chilean association football commentators